Richard Pianaro (born 1 September 1949) is a French racing cyclist. He rode in the 1975 Tour de France.

References

1949 births
Living people
French male cyclists
Place of birth missing (living people)